The sassafras caloptilia moth (Caloptilia sassafrasella) is a moth of the family Gracillariidae. It is known from Canada and the United States (including Connecticut, Florida, Georgia, Maine, Maryland, Missouri, Texas and Kentucky).

The wingspan is about 11 mm.

The larvae feed on Sassafras albidum, Sassafras officinale var. albidum and Sassafras sassafras. They mine the leaves of their host plant. Later instars are found in a downward rolled leaf.

References

External links
Caloptilia at microleps.org
mothphotographersgroup
Bug Guide

sassafrasella
Moths of North America